The Attorney General's Advisory Committee of United States Attorneys (AGAC), is a committee of the United States Department of Justice.

History
The creation of the committee was first announced in 1973 by Attorney General Elliot Richardson.

Composition
"The Committee consists of 17 United States Attorneys selected by the Attorney General. They are intended to represent office size, judicial district, issues and diversity. Service on the Committee normally shall not exceed three years. New members are appointed each year to provide for broad representation of United States Attorneys nationwide. The Attorney General selects a chairperson and vice-chairperson. The Committee establishes such subcommittees as it deems necessary to carry out its functions."

Function
"The Advisory Committee has two functions. It gives United States Attorneys a voice in Department policies and advises the Attorney General of the United States.

In advising the Attorney General, the Committee conducts studies and makes recommendations to improve management of United States Attorney operations and the relationship between the Department and the federal prosecutors. It also helps formulate new programs for improvement of the criminal justice system and the delivery of legal services at all levels.

In serving the United States Attorneys, the Committee coordinates the collective efforts of the United States Attorneys with the divisions and agencies of the Department of Justice, and departments and agencies external to the Department of Justice. It also represents the United States Attorneys with the Department of Justice, other departments and agencies of the government, and occasionally private organizations."

Interpretation
"The Advisory Committee plays a vital role in furthering the Department's law enforcement efforts and gives U.S. Attorneys a key voice in Department policy. Together in partnership with state, local and federal authorities, the Advisory Committee is crucial in advancing the Department's efforts to battle terrorism and prosecute corporate fraud, as well as continue its law enforcement mission in areas such as civil rights, violent crime, and immigration".

Attorney General Eric Holder's Original Advisory Committee

Attorney General Eric Holder appointed his original Advisory Committee in October 2009.  Minnesota U.S. Attorney B. Todd  Jones was selected to chair the Committee, replacing Northern Illinois U.S. Attorney Patrick Fitzgerald, who remained on the Committee.  He also appointed U.S. Attorneys Preet Bharara (Southern District of New York), Dennis Burke (District of Arizona), Jenny Durkan (Western District of Washington), Paul Fishman (District of New Jersey), Neil McBride (Eastern District of Virginia), Peter Neronha (District of Rhode Island), and Joyce White Vance (Northern District of Alabama), as well as Channing Phillips (Acting U.S. Attorney for the District of Columbia) and John Davis (Criminal Chief, Eastern District of Virginia).

Current Membership

, AGAC membership consists of:
 Damian Williams - Southern District of New York, Chair
 Cindy K. Chung - Western District of Pennsylvania, Vice Chair
 Darcie McElwee - District of Maine
 Trini Ross – Western District of New York
 Sandra Hairston – Middle District of North Carolina
 Brandon Brown – Western District of Louisiana
 Dawn Ison – Eastern District of Michigan
 Gregory Harris - Central District of Illinois
 Andrew Luger – District of Minnesota
 Gary Restaino – District of Arizona
 Cole Finegan – District of Colorado
 Matthew Graves – District of Columbia

References

United States Department of Justice